Alexander Williamson may refer to:

 Alexander William Williamson (1824–1904), chemist who discovered the Williamson ether synthesis reaction
 Alexander Williamson (missionary) (1829–1890), Scottish Protestant missionary to China with the London Missionary Society
 Alexander Watt Williamson (1849–1928), New Zealand schoolteacher
Alexander Williamson (colonial administrator) from 1897 Diamond Jubilee Honours